This is a list of characters in the USA Network original comedy-drama TV series Psych and subsequent movies that were released on Peacock.  The principal cast of the series has remained the same throughout the series.  However, various recurring characters have appeared over the course of the show's run.

Main characters

Recurring characters

Young Shawn 
Young Shawn (portrayed by Liam James and Skyler Gisondo in the majority of appearances) is the younger version of Shawn Spencer.  He is almost always shown learning life lessons from his father, usually tying into the main events of the episode.  The character usually appears in flashbacks to the late 80s or early 90s.  Young Shawn first appeared in the pilot episode, and has appeared in nearly every episode for the first six seasons.

In "The Polarizing Express" (5.14), Young Shawn appears in adult Shawn's dream in 2010. The character makes light of the rotating actors in the role when Tony Cox comments that Shawn and his younger self look nothing alike. Young Shawn (portrayed by Skyler Gisondo) replies, "Well, we changed!"  Then, looking at adult Shawn he says, "Sometimes from week to week, huh?," which adult Shawn confirms.

In "And Down the Stretch Comes Murder" (2.05), Young Shawn occurs in multiple flashbacks in which Shawn tries to find the culprit that shot a spit ball at the teacher's head, ending in getting Jimmy (Bully) kicked out of school. Jimmy, now a horse jockey, returns in the beginning of the episode, to hire Psych to talk to his horse.

Young Gus 
Young Gus (portrayed by Carlos McCullers II in the majority of appearances) is the younger version of Gus.  He almost always appears with Young Shawn, occasionally learning life lessons from Henry as well.  The character always appears in flashbacks to the late 80s or early 90s.  Young Gus first appeared in "Spellingg Bee" (1.02) and has appeared in many episodes throughout the first six seasons.

Buzz McNab 
Officer (Junior Detective (season 8 finale episode), Head Detective (from Psych 2 onward) Buzz McNab (Sage Brocklebank) is a member of the SBPD, who occasionally works with Detectives Lassiter and O'Hara, as well as Shawn and Gus.  McNab is a naive, lovable cop who is always eager to please Lassiter, even though Lassiter doesn't always treat him well.  He first appeared in the pilot episode, and has been shown occasionally. 

He has a wife, Francine, whom he marries in the first season, and a pet cat.

In the first-season episode "9 Lives" (1.05), McNab, in preparation for his wedding, calls a 1-800 stress-line, leading to almost becoming a victim in a murder.  By the fourth season, he has already had two more brushes with death, including being wounded by an exploding mailbox in "Shawn Gets the Yips" (4.05) and knocked unconscious by a serial killer in "Mr. Yin Presents..." (4.16).

In the seventh season episode "Deez Nups", It is revealed that McNab has been moonlighting as a stripper. At the end of Season 7 he is fired by interim Chief Harris Trout.

After Lassiter is promoted to SBPD Chief, McNab is rehired in the seventh episode of Season 8. In the series finale, McNab is promoted to Junior Detective. Beginning with the second movie, McNab was promoted to Head Detective.

Woody the Coroner 
Dr. Woodrow "Woody" Strode (Kurt Fuller) is the quirky coroner for Santa Barbara.  He shares many character traits with Shawn.  He first appeared in "High Top Fade Out" (4.07) and then became a frequently recurring character.

In "Shawn 2.0" (5.08), he reveals that he had a wife.  Shawn soon points out that she was cheating on him with her personal trainer, and Woody responds that he had approved.  When Shawn points out other men in her life, Woody states that he hadn't approved those particular men.

He is apparently wanted in the Philippines, as made evident in "Dead Bear Walking"' (5.15).  While being filmed for a documentary by Lassiter's sister, he attempts to alter his voice for "legal purposes."

Madeleine Spencer 
Dr. Madeleine Spencer (Cybill Shepherd) is Shawn's mother and Henry's ex-wife.  She has an eidetic memory, which she passed on to her son.  She first appeared in a cameo appearance in "Shawn (and Gus) of the Dead" (2.16), and made her first major appearance in "Ghosts" (3.01).

In her first main appearance, "Ghosts" (3.01), she returns to Santa Barbara as a police psychologist.  She explains to Shawn that she left his father in 1992 to pursue a job opportunity, a surprise to Shawn, who had always believed Henry left her.  By her second appearance, in "Murder? ... Anyone? ... Anyone? ... Bueller?" (3.02), she has begun to spend more time with Henry; they even attend their son's high school reunion together.

In the third season finale, "An Evening with Mr. Yang" (3.16), she is kidnapped by Yang and almost killed by a car bomb.  However, she is saved when Shawn identifies Yang and has her arrested.  After the ordeal, she shares a brief kiss with Henry.

In the sequel to "An Evening with Mr. Yang," "Mr. Yin Presents..." (4.16), she is revealed to be at a conference in New York, where she is safe from Yin's murderous rampage.  However, she does not appear in the episode.

She appears in "Yang 3 in 2D" (5.16), where it is revealed that Yang lived three blocks down from the Spencers, and that she had taken a picture of Shawn with Yang.

Abigail Lytar 
Abigail Lytar (Rachael Leigh Cook) is Shawn's ex-girlfriend.  She is an elementary school teacher.  She first appeared in "Murder? ... Anyone? ... Anyone? ... Bueller?" (3.02) and in "Mr. Yin Presents..." (4.16).

She first appears in "Murder? ... Anyone? ... Anyone? ... Bueller?" (3.02) at Shawn and Gus's high school reunion.  It is revealed that she had been stood-up by Shawn at a high school dance, when he left her standing alone on a pier.  Together, they solve the murder of one of their former classmates.  In "An Evening with Mr. Yang" (3.16), Gus accuses Shawn of not being able to keep a steady relationship.  He then proceeds to call Abigail, immediately asking her on a date.  Over the course of the episode, however, he is forced to keep pushing the time back as he struggles to capture Yang.  Finally, the two share their first real date at a drive-in theater in Gus's car (though Gus stays in the backseat the entire time).

Abigail returns in the fourth season in the episode "He Dead" (4.02), wanting to meet Henry for the first time.  However, Shawn attempts to prevent it, claiming that his relationship with his father is already strained.  Despite his attempts, the two finally meet, and get along very well, much to Shawn's surprise.  Abigail returned again in "Bollywood Homicide" (4.06), in which Shawn invites her to a crime scene.  When Lassiter embarrasses Shawn in front of Abigail, Shawn becomes determined to solve the case, and eventually does.  In the summer finale, "You Can't Handle This Episode" (4.10), Abigail reveals to Shawn that she is moving to Uganda for six months, and that she wants to put their relationship on hold until she visits in February.

When Abigail returns from Uganda in "Mr. Yin Presents..." (4.16), she is met with an unwelcome surprise.  Upon her arrival at the airport, Officer McNab picks her up, due to Shawn's preoccupation with catching Yin.  Immediately, McNab is drugged, and Abigail is kidnapped by Yin.  After Yin ties her to the bottom of the pier (where Shawn stood her up in high school), Shawn is issued an ultimatum: rescue Juliet or rescue Abigail.  He chooses Abigail, and barely succeeds in saving her life.  However, immediately afterward, she tells Shawn she can't take the stress of his job any longer, and breaks up with him. However, she did tell Shawn to call her if he ever gave up "chasing psychos."

Winnie Guster 
Winnifred "Winnie" Guster (Phylicia Rashad) is the mother of Gus and Joy Guster, and the wife of Bill Guster.  She first appeared in "Gus's Dad May Have Killed an Old Guy" (2.10) followed by "Christmas Joy" (3.09) and in "A Nightmare on State Street" (8.09).

She first appeared in "Gus's Dad May Have Killed an Old Guy" (2.10), in which Shawn and Henry visit the Gusters for Christmas.  She, along with her husband, was arrested for the murder of their neighbor.  It was believed that they murdered him after it was revealed that she was being blackmailed for insurance fraud, and that Mr. Guster had been having an ongoing feud with the deceased.  Shawn is determined to solve the case, due to their dislike of him.  They blame him for being a negative influence on Gus.  However, he solves the murder, revealing that it was not in any way connected to them.  They are grateful, and finally accept Shawn.

Mrs. Guster returns in "Christmas Joy" (3.09).  Shawn, Gus, and her daughter Joy all stay with the Gusters for the holidays.  It is made known that she had used a bookie to place one bet, and had lost most of her savings.  However, her family forgives her, and she forgives her family for all the mistakes that they had made as well.

Bill Guster 
William "Bill" Guster (Ernie Hudson and Keith David) is the father of Gus and Joy Guster, and the husband of Winnie Guster.  He first appeared in "Gus's Dad May Have Killed an Old Guy" (2.10) and most recently in "Christmas Joy" (3.09).

He first appears in "Gus's Dad May Have Killed an Old Guy" (2.10), in which Shawn and Henry visit the Gusters for Christmas.  He, along with his wife, is arrested for the murder of their neighbor.  It is believed that they had murdered him after it was revealed that he was having an ongoing feud with the deceased.  Shawn is determined to solve the case, due to their dislike of him.  They blame him for being a negative influence on Gus.  However, he solves the murder, revealing that it was not in any way connected to them.  They are grateful, and finally accept Shawn.

Mr. Guster returns in "Christmas Joy" (3.09).  Shawn, Gus, and his daughter Joy all stay with the Gusters for the holidays.  It is made known that he had lost his job months earlier, and had been looking for a job during the days ever since.  However, his family forgives him, and he forgives his family for all the mistakes that they had made as well.

Mr. Yang 
Mr. Yang (Ally Sheedy) was a serial killer who murdered her first victim in 1995.  That year, she killed six people after a game of cat-and-mouse with each of them.  Over the next 14 years, she killed two others, and was still not caught, nor her identity revealed.  She first appeared in "An Evening with Mr. Yang" (3.16) and in Psych: The Musical (7.15).

In "An Evening with Mr. Yang" (3.16), she returns, this time, to play her game with Shawn Spencer.  After Henry's adamant protests to the contrary, Shawn accepts her proposition, vowing to bring her to justice.  She first kidnaps Shawn and Gus's waitress and holds her hostage.  After leaving several cryptic clues for Shawn, the hostage is finally returned, but replaced with Shawn's mother, Madeleine.  After strapping a bomb to Madeleine, Yang sits and watches as the SBPD swarms a drive-in theater looking for her.  Shawn finds her car, and she finally comes face-to-face with her target.  She reveals to Shawn that she is going to write a book about them, and is finally arrested.

When Shawn and Gus speak to Mary (a psychologist who helped bring Yang to justice) a year later, in "Mr. Yin Presents..." (4.16), he reveals that it would be impossible for Yang to work alone, and proposed that she was working with a Yin.  He discerns this from Yang's book, entitled From Serial Dater to Serial Killer: How Murder Kept Me Skinny.  Mary's theory proves to be true, and Shawn, Gus, and Mary proceed to visit Yang in her tiny cell at an asylum.  She is being held in a completely white and grey cell, due to her tendencies toward violence when exposed to color (to which Gus responds, "What about my face?!").  While there, Yang admits to working with a Yin.  She says, "If you think I'm sick, you ain't seen nothing yet."  This proves to be true, as Yin (representing chaos) has no rules.

In "Yang 3 in 2D" (5.16), it is revealed that Yang had lived only three blocks from the Spencers.  It was there that she had her picture taken with Shawn by Madeleine.  After briefly letting Yang out of the asylum to help capture Yin, Shawn and Gus discover that Yang is actually Yin's daughter, and that Yin had actually committed each of the murders attributed to Yang (including the attempted murders of "An Evening with Mr. Yang").  They watch helplessly as she murders her father for trying to harm Shawn.  She is subsequently taken back into custody.

Yang's sexuality is questionable, as Yin, her father, says that she "developed an unhealthy crush" for Shawn in "Yang 3 in 2D." However, Yang says in Mr. Yin Presents..." that she "has the googly eyes" for her "lady guard friend," a woman in charge of escorting visitors to Yang's cell during her incarceration. The guard, however, is "playing hard to get." Yang also says in "Yang 3 in 2D" that "hosting The View and making out with Elisabeth Hasselbeck is impossible," indicating that this might have been a fantasy of some sort of hers. 

Yang appears in Psych: The Musical (7.15), in which she becomes the main informant for information on an escaped murderer being chased by the SBPD. She is later stabbed to death by the actual murderer (Ben) after saving Shawn's life. This is followed by an after-death duet between her and Mary, in which the latter reveals that she probably won't get into heaven, but Mary knows a guy who will get her in.

Mr. Yin 
Mr. Yin (Christopher Turner and Peter Weller) was Yang's counterpart and former partner and was even more murderous than she. He was evidently obsessed with the films of Alfred Hitchcock, as his murders were almost always taken right out of a Hitchcock film. Yin first appeared in "Mr. Yin Presents..." (4.16) and last in "Yang 3 in 2D" (5.16).

Yin's existence is unknown until "Mr. Yin Presents..." (4.16), when Mary Lightly proposes that Yang had a partner during the events of "An Evening with Mr. Yang" (3.16). He begins murdering people, starting with the waitress who served Shawn, Gus, and Mary pie. He arranges the body (with two rocks) into a Yin/Yang symbol. Mary warns that, while Yang followed a set of rules, Yin would not. He said that once a person discovered the rules of Yin, the rules would change. This proves to be true very soon, when Yin murders Mary, just as "Mother" kills Detective Arbogast in Psycho. Yin flees, and then "casts" Shawn, Gus, Lassiter, Juliet, and Henry as "archetypal characters from Hitchcock's canon." While there, he kidnaps Juliet. He then travels to the airport, where McNab is picking up Abigail. Yin drugs McNab and kidnaps Abigail, forcing Shawn to choose which one he wants to save. Yin ties Abigail to the bottom of a pier and forces Shawn to make another decision: catch Yin or save Abigail. Shawn picks Abigail and Henry helps him while Gus and Lassiter save Juliet, but Yin flees once again. The episode ends with Yin stroking a picture of Yang with a young Shawn Spencer.

In "Yang 3 in 2D" (5.16), it is revealed that he is actually Yang's father and had committed all of the murders attributed to her. His true identity is revealed as Professor Karl Rotmensen. He has also taken on a new apprentice (Allison Cowley), replacing Yang. After a brief reconciliation with Yang, he is killed by her.

Mary Lightly 
Dr. Mary Lightly III (Jimmi Simpson) was a criminal psychologist who was obsessed with the Yin/Yang cases.  He also had a disdain for racquetball because he "would not wear short pants".  He first appeared in "An Evening with Mr. Yang" (3.16) and last in "Psych: The Musical" (7.15).

In his very first scene, he is forced to explain his name, saying that his "father was named Mary, his father before him was named Mary, and his father before him was named Craig". He has very odd quirks, including a "creepy handshake."  After studying the Yang case for 13 years, he returned to Santa Barbara when Yang resurfaced.  He provided several insights that were invaluable in catching Yang and bringing her to justice.

In "Mr. Yin Presents..." (4.16), he visits Shawn and Gus, revealing that he never left Santa Barbara, and reveals his theory that Yang was not working alone.  He believes that a Yin exists, and that he is even more murderous than Yang.  After following Yin's clues, Shawn and Gus are led to believe that Mary is, in fact, Yin.  However, after following him to (what appears to be) an abandoned building, they see him stabbed, just as Martin Balsam in Alfred Hitchcock's Psycho.  He dies in Shawn's arms.  In the final scenes of the episode, Shawn, Gus, and Mary's mother are shown attending his racquetball-themed funeral.

In "Yang 3 in 2D" (5.16), the team discovers a videotape made by Mary days before his murder. It mostly consisted of random poetry and thoughts (including questioning the popularity of One Tree Hill), but eventually included valuable insight to the Yin/Yang relationship. Mary stated that he believed Yin would be jealous of Yang's popularity, and that Yin would attempt to take "revenge of the highest malevolence". During the video he refers to himself as "Marion", which is probably his full name.

Mary makes a brief appearance in "Psych: The Musical" (7.15) in an after-death sequence. In a duet between himself and Yang, he implies that Yang will probably not get into heaven. Yang suggests he might advocate on her behalf, and he says he knows someone who knows someone who might be able to help.

Mary also makes another brief appearance in Psych: The Movie in Shawn's dream, during which he performs an acoustic version of "Allison Road" by Gin Blossoms. Shawn joins in, and they are later joined by Juliet (as Holographic Leia) and Gus (as Prince). It isn't until near the end of the episode that Shawn realizes Mary was trying to give him a hint about who the villain of the movie is: Allison Cowley.

Subsequently, in Psych 2: Lassie Come Home, Mary appears in another dream sequence. After Shawn finds out about Juliet's supposed pregnancy with his child, Mary is seen as a baby whose actions and requests play to a certain degree on Shawn's insecurities about fatherhood, but the dream serves as a crucial segway to the eventual resolution to who was responsible for attacking Lassie.

Pierre Despereaux 
Pierre Despereaux (Cary Elwes) is an extremely elusive Canadian art thief.  He first appeared in "Extradition: British Columbia" (4.01), when Shawn and Gus travel to Canada on vacation and recognized him.  Shawn called Lassiter and confirmed his identity.  However, it is revealed that he, in fact, is simply an insurance fraudster. Lassiter had boasted of being in a long cat-and-mouse game with Despereaux for years and gloated over the arrest, only to discover Despereaux had no idea who Lassiter was. 

Despereaux returns in "Extradition II: The Actual Extradition Part" (5.10), in which he is accused of multiple murders after his escape from prison.  He is later cleared of the murder charges and finally extradited to the United States.

He returns again in the episode "Indiana Shawn and the Temple of the Kinda Crappy, Rusty Old Dagger" (6.10), in which he races with Shawn and Gus against a gang of art thieves to find an old dagger that opens a secret stash of paintings.  Over the course of the investigation, he is forced to fake his own death in order to avoid prison.  Despereaux, along with Shawn and Gus, uncovers the art, revealing many seemingly worthless paintings.  He later steals one of these and removes the paint, revealing a Rembrandt underneath.  He is now believed by the SBPD to be deceased, though Shawn and Gus know that this is false.

Elwes' character resurfaces in  the episode "Lock, Stock, Some Smoking Barrels and Burton Guster's Goblet of Fire" (8.01) which was a British themed episode. Despereaux invites Shawn and Gus to London. There, he advises them that "Pierre Despereaux" was merely a name he used while undercover for Interpol, and reveals that he is actually Interpol's deputy director, with his real name being Royston Cornwallis Staley. He also reveals that he invited Shawn (who bears a passable resemblance to a hardened criminal) to go undercover and infiltrate a heist. When Shawn checks the story with Lassiter in Santa Barbara by phone, Lassie tells him that he found no record of any Roy Staley. 

Believing that Despereaux set them up again, Shawn and Gus withhold information from "Staley", which leads to Staley placing his immediate inferior in prison for following Shawn's directive to stall Staley. Staley himself then joins the undercover operation and assists Shawn and Gus in stopping the culprits, but is seen stealing the art in the process before coming back to rescue Shawn and Gus. As the culprits are taken into custody, Shawn and Gus see someone whom they believe to be Staley's immediate superior, who fires Staley. When they later see "Staley's superior" undercover, they wonder whether or not to believe Staley's story, though Shawn seems more inclined to do so than Gus.

Declan Rand 
Declan Rand (Nestor Carbonell) is a fake criminal profiler who briefly dated Juliet.  With the exception of Gus, Madeleine and Henry, he is the only character who knows Shawn is not psychic at the time of his appearance.  He first appeared in "Shawn 2.0" (5.08) and last in "One, Maybe Two, Ways Out" (5.09).

Declan first appears in "Shawn 2.0" (5.08), in which he was hired by the SBPD to a case Shawn and Gus were already working.  He quickly surpassed them, and was given all the credit for the case.  Later, however, they discover that he is not really a criminal profiler; he is just extremely rich and is working "for fun."  Declan is aware that Shawn is not really a psychic, while Shawn is aware that Declan is not really a criminal profiler.  Declan, like Shawn, soon falls for Juliet.  Just as Shawn goes to confess to Juliet that he is not really a psychic and ask her out, Declan confesses that he is not really a criminal profiler.  Juliet appreciates his honesty, and begins to date him.

In "One, Maybe Two, Ways Out" (5.09), Shawn and Gus need Declan's assistance in another case.  He agrees, but must confess to Juliet every time he helps, to Shawn and Gus's vehement protests.  After discovering that Declan is taking Juliet on a two-week vacation, Shawn tells Gus how he feels about Juliet.  Juliet overhears everything he says.  While visiting Declan, Shawn ends up alone with Juliet, and she kisses him.  Declan reenters the room, and Shawn leaves.

By the next episode, "Extradition II: The Actual Extradition Part" (5.10), it is revealed that Juliet has broken up with Declan.

Marlowe Viccellio Lassiter 
Marlowe Viccellio Lassiter (Kristy Swanson) is introduced as a murder suspect in "This Episode Sucks" (6.03), in which the SBPD discovers that she has been stealing blood in order to help her dying brother.  She is then sent to prison, but not before creating a connection with Lassie.  Their relationship grows throughout the sixth season and she appears later in "Let's Doo-Wop It Again" (6.13). She and Lassiter were engaged (7.06) and were married in "Deez Nups" (7.07). In "S.E.I.Z.E The Day" (8.02), she revealed to Lassiter that she was pregnant.

In "Shawn and Gus Truck Things Up" (8.07), Marlowe gives birth to her daughter Lily, in the back of Shawn and Gus's "Smash & Grab" food truck. In the series finale, "The Break Up" (8.10), Lassiter tells Marlowe to put the baby on the phone and says "Hi, Lily. This is your daddy."

Harris Trout
Harris Trout (Anthony Michael Hall) is special police consultant whose job is to increase efficiency within the department. He first appears in “No Trout About It” (7.14), having been hired by the mayor to investigate an apparently bungled case Shawn and Gus took of a man who hired them to find his murderer (he had been fatally poisoned). Upon conclusion of Trout's investigation, he suspends Chief Vick for six months due to her failure to run the department appropriately. Trout himself subsequently is appointed as the new interim chief of the Santa Barbra Police Department and immediately ends  the use of psychics, demotes Lassiter from head detective to patrol officer, and promotes Juliet to interim head detective. Following that promotion, Juliet still defers to Lassiter when she can, and consistently invites him to help with her cases. 

In “Someone’s Got a Woody” (8.04), Trout oversees hostage negations with a suspected murderer who has taken SBPD coroner Dr. Woody Strode hostage in the morgue. After Lassiter, Jules, Shawn and Gus ignore Trout's unreasonable and dangerous orders (which would have led to mass casualties, including Woody himself), Trout attempts to fire both Juliet and Lassiter and symbolically fire Shawn and Gus (as they were never hired in the first place), but is instead fired by the mayor for his reckless hostage techniques.

In "C. O. G. Blocked" (8.05), during a dialogue exchange between Lassiter and Shawn, it is revealed that, following his firing, Trout was institutionalized for court-ordered psychiatric evaluation due to his reckless behavior, rash decisions, and unjustified anger. Trout's fate thereafter is presently unknown. Meanwhile, Trout's firing and mental state led the city to reverse his prior decisions, including Lassiter's demotion, O'Hara's interim promotion, and the SBPD ban on hiring psychics, which allowed Shawn and Gus to return to employment as police-sanctioned consultants.

Minor characters 
The following are characters appearing in multiple episodes in small roles.
Det. Lucinda Barry (Anne Dudek) is a detective who worked in the SBPD until it was revealed (by Shawn) that she was having a relationship with Lassiter.  Barry appeared in the Pilot episode.  Dudek did not return to the show for a main role, and the character was written out (without her presence) in the second episode, "Spellingg Bee". She was replaced by Juliet O'Hara, but was later mentioned by Lassiter in "Shawn Rescues Darth Vader" (6.01). Her death is implied in the episode "Santabarbaratown 2" (7.01) due to a shooting range tournament being named in her memory.
Corporal Robert Mackintosh (Peter Oldring) is a Canadian police officer who first appeared in "Extradition: British Columbia" (4.01).  Due to events that transpired in the episode, he was demoted to traffic duty.  He returned in "Extradition II: The Actual Extradition Part" (5.10), in which it is revealed that he has been re-promoted.
Deputy Commissioner Ed Dykstra (Ed Lauter) is a Canadian law-enforcement officer, and Mackintosh's superior.  He first appeared in "Extradition: British Columbia" (4.01) and returned in "Extradition II: The Actual Extradition Part" (5.10).
Father Peter Westley (Ray Wise) is a priest at a Catholic church.  He first appeared in "The Devil is in the Details... and the Upstairs Bedroom" (4.04) when he was suspected of the murder of a young college girl.  However, he is not the killer.  He returned in "Dual Spires" (5.12), a homage to Wise's previous television series Twin Peaks, in which he saves the lives of Shawn and Gus. He is also said to have blessed a bottle of holy water over the phone for Gus in "This Episode Sucks" (6.03).
Gina Repach (Sarah Edmondson) is a former girlfriend of Shawn.  She appeared in "Shawn Takes a Shot in the Dark" (4.09), in which he called her in an attempt to save his own life.  However, she hung up on him, angry that he would call after dumping her.  She later appeared in "Shawn 2.0" (5.08) when Shawn cannot find a date to a friend's wedding.
Ken Wong (Jerry Shea) is Psych's former assistant. He appeared in "Romeo and Juliet and Juliet" (5.01), in which he was immediately fired due to monetary problems. He later appeared again in "In Plain Fright" (5.11) when he is again coerced to work for Psych for free.
Officer Martha Allen (Patricia Idlette) is a desk sergeant with the SBPD. She believes Shawn can speak to her dead grandmother. She appeared in the pilot episode and "Woman Seeking Dead Husband: Smokers Okay, No Pets" (1.04).
Officer Dobson  is an officer who has been floating unobserved in the background of the SBPD for the eight years of the show and is often the one who Lasiter yells for to get things done. Despite being named in all eight seasons, he is only seen on-screen during the series finale, as portrayed by Val Kilmer.

Notable guest stars 

 Kevin Alejandro ("Ferry Tale")
 Mädchen Amick ("Indiana Shawn and the Temple of the Kinda Crappy, Rusty Old Dagger")
 John Amos ("Meat Is Murder, But Murder Is Also Murder")
 Anthony Anderson ("True Grits")
 Curtis Armstrong ("The Old and the Restless")
 Tom Arnold ("A Touch of Sweevil")
 Dana Ashbrook ("Dual Spires")
 Mackenzie Astin ("Tuesday the 17th")
 Diedrich Bader ("The Tao of Gus")
 Diora Baird ("The Tao of Gus")
 Christine Baranski ("He Dead")
 Malcolm Barrett ("Zero to Murder in Sixty Seconds")
 Justine Bateman ("Tuesday the 17th")
 Garcelle Beauvais ("Dead Air")
 Jim Beaver ("High Noon-ish")
 Doron Bell Jr. ("We’d Like to Thank the Academy")
 Rob Benedict ("True Grits")
 The Big Show ("Lassie Jerky")
 Bre Blair ("Shawn vs. the Red Phantom")
 Wade Boggs ("Dead Man’s Curve Ball")
 Katrina Bowden ("Scary Sherry: Bianca's Toast")
 John Ross Bowie ("Weekend Warriors")
 April Bowlby ("Dead Bear Walking")
 Wayne Brady ("Shawn and the Real Girl")
 James Brolin ("High Noon-ish")
 Yvette Nicole Brown ("A Touch of Sweevil")
 Jere Burns ("Disco Didn't Die. It Was Murdered!")
 Dean Cameron ("A Nightmare on State Street")
 Bruce Campbell ("A Nightmare on State Street")
 John Cena ("You Can't Handle This Episode", ”Psych: The Movie”)
 Faune Chambers ("Christmas Joy")
 Jay Chandrasekhar ("Bollywood Homicide")
 Claire Coffee ("Weekend Warriors")
 Gary Cole ("Gus Walks Into a Bank")
 Catherine E. Coulson ("Dual Spires")
 Tony Cox ("The Polarizing Express")
 Tim Curry ("American Duos")
 Lolita Davidovich ("Santabarbaratown")
 Don S. Davis ("Pilot") 
 Cristián de la Fuente ("American Duos")
 Amanda Detmer ("Black and Tan: A Crime of Fashion")
 William Devane ("Viagra Falls")
 Brooke D'Orsay ("Six Feet Under the Sea")
 Brad Dourif ("Shawn, Interrupted")
 Nora Dunn ("In Plain Fright") 
 Rob Estes ("Santabarbaratown")
 Jeff Fahey ("Daredevils!")
 Corey Feldman ("This Episode Sucks")
 Sherilyn Fenn ("Dual Spires")
 Jennifer Finnigan ("Neil Simon’s Lover’s Retreat")
 Sutton Foster ("A Nightmare on State Street")
 Lee Garlington ("Chivalry Is Not Dead... But Someone Is")
 Gina Gershon ("American Duos")
 Danny Glover ("Dead Man’s Curve Ball")
 Louis Gossett Jr. ("Heeeeere’s Lassie")
 Milena Govich ("Earth, Wind and... Wait for It")
 Jon Gries ("One, Maybe Two, Ways Out")
 Greg Grunberg ("Shawn and the Real Girl")
 Ernie Grunwald ("Death Is in the Air")
 Tony Hale ("Neil Simon’s Lover’s Retreat")
 Anthony Michael Hall
 Philip Baker Hall ("Dis-Lodged")
 Van Hansis ("This Episode Sucks")
 John Hawkes ("Shawn Takes a Shot in the Dark")
 Glenne Headly ("Autopsy Turvy")
 Howard Hesseman ("And Down the Stretch Comes Murder")
 John Michael Higgins ("Chivalry Is Not Dead... But Someone Is")
 Michael Hogan ("The Head, the Tail, the Whole Damn Episode")
 Scott Holroyd ("He Dead")
 C. Thomas Howell ("One, Maybe Two, Ways Out")
 Steve Howey ("Thrill Seekers and Hell-Raisers")
 Pascale Hutton ("Pilot")
 Stoney Jackson ("True Grits")
 Mickie James ("Talk Derby to Me")
 Vinnie Jones ("Lock, Stock, Some Smoking Barrels and Burton Guster's Goblets of Fire")
 Stacy Keibler ("Thrill Seekers and Hell-Raisers")
 Val Kilmer ("The Break-Up")
 Richard Kind ("From the Earth to the Starbucks")
 Suzanne Krull ("The Tao of Gus")
 Rob LaBelle ("In Plain Fright")
 Stephen Lang ("Shawn Gets the Yips")
 Ted Lange ("Disco Didn't Die. It Was Murdered!")
 Dan Lauria ("Poker? I Barely Know Her")
 Sheryl Lee ("Dual Spires")
 Robyn Lively ("Dual Spires")
 Christopher Lloyd ("100 Clues")

 Ed Lover ("Last Night Gus")
 Jessica Lucas ("Last Night Gus")
 Jane Lynch ("There Might Be Blood")
 Ralph Macchio ("We’d Like to Thank the Academy")
 Joshua Malina ("Let's Get Hairy")
 Cheech Marin ("Let’s Doo-Wop It Again")
 Chi McBride ("Ferry Tale")
 Christopher McDonald ("Ghosts")
 Ryan McDonald ("Dual Spires")
 Malcolm McDowell ("Shawn Rescues Darth Vader")
 Bruce McGill ("Earth, Wind and... Wait for It")
 Ted McGinley ("Six Feet Under the Sea")
 Joey McIntyre ("The Amazing Psych-Man and Tap Man, Issue #2") 
 Kate Micucci ("Autopsy Turvy")
 Ivana Miličević ("Autopsy Turvy")
 The Miz ("Shawn and the Real Girl")
 Meredith Monroe ("Shawn 2.0")
 Garrett Morris ("100 Clues")
 Oliver Muirhead ("Santabarbaratown 2")
 Martin Mull ("100 Clues")
 Brian Doyle Murray ("The Old and the Restless")
 David Naughton ("Let's Get Hairy")
 Judd Nelson ("Death Is in the Air")
 Larisa Oleynik ("Let's Get Hairy")
 Meghan Ory("Viagra Falls")
 Kelly Overton ("There Might Be Blood")
 Robert Patrick ("You Can't Handle This Episode")
 Amanda Pays ("Black and Tan: A Crime of Fashion")
 Mekhi Phifer ("Let’s Doo-Wop It Again")
 Lou Diamond Phillips ("Psy vs. Psy")
 Tony Plana ("No Country for Two Old Men")
 Franka Potente ("One, Maybe Two, Ways Out")
 Jason Priestley ("Neil Simon’s Lover’s Retreat")
 Freddie Prinze Jr. ("Not Even Close... Encounters")
 Keshia Knight Pulliam ("The Polarizing Express")
 Sendhil Ramamurthy ("Bollywood Homicide")
 John Rhys-Davies ("Indiana Shawn and the Temple of the Kinda Crappy, Rusty Old Dagger")
 Deon Richmond ("The Break-Up")
 Molly Ringwald ("Shawn, Interrupted")
 Adam Rodriguez ("Shawn and Gus in Drag (Racing)")
 Michael Rooker ("Shawn Takes a Shot in the Dark")
 Saul Rubinek ("Lights, Camera... Homicidio")
 Alan Ruck ("Gus Walks Into a Bank")
 Sara Rue ("Heeeeere’s Lassie")
 Mercedes Ruehl ("Scary Sherry: Bianca's Toast")
 Jeri Ryan ("The Head, the Tail, the Whole Damn Episode")
 Amanda Schull ("Santabarbaratown")
 Brent Sexton ("High Noon-ish")
 Sarah Shahi ("Thrill Seekers and Hell-Raisers")
 William Shatner ("In for a Penny..." and "Heeeeere's Lassie")
 Jonathan Silverman ("Truer Lies")
 Jean Smart ("Chivalry Is Not Dead... But Someone Is")
 Curt Smith ("Shawn 2.0", "100 Clues")
 Kurtwood Smith ("Forget Me Not")
 Kevin Sorbo ("Bounty Hunters!")
 Todd Stashwick ("Ghosts")
 French Stewart ("Autopsy Turvy")
 Peter Stormare ("Someone's Got a Woody")
 Mena Suvari ("Yang 3 in 2D", "Psych: The Movie")
 George Takei ("Shawn vs. the Red Phantom")
 Jeffrey Tambor ("No Country for Two Old Men" and "Right Turn or Left for Dead")
 Kenan Thompson ("High Top Fade-Out")
 Tony Todd ("High Top Fade-Out")
 Keegan Connor Tracy ("Cloudy... Chance of Murder")
 Michael Trucco ("Dead Man’s Curve Ball")
 Beverley Turner ("Mr. Yin Presents...")
 Steve Valentine ("100 Clues")
 Jacob Vargas ("The Polarizing Express")
 Lenny Von Dohlen ("Dual Spires")
 Arnold Vosloo ("A Very Juliet Episode")
 Polly Walker ("Shawn Rescues Darth Vader")
 Lesley Ann Warren ("100 Clues")
 Kerry Washington ("There's Something About Mira")
 Carl Weathers ("Viagra Falls")
 Steven Weber ("The Greatest Adventure in the History of Basic Cable")
 Michael Weston ("Cloudy... Chance of Murder", "Remake A.K.A. Cloudy... With a Chance of Improvement")
 Frank Whaley ("Who Ya Gonna Call?")
 Jaleel White ("High Top Fade-Out," "Let's Doo-Wop It Again")
 Christopher Wiehl ("Any Given Friday Night at 10pm, 9pm Central")
 Mykelti Williamson ("Any Given Friday Night at 10pm, 9pm Central")
 Shannon Woodward ("Scary Sherry: Bianca's Toast")
 Calum Worthy ("If You're So Smart, Then Why Are You Dead?")
 William Zabka ("A Nightmare on State Street")
 Billy Zane ("The Break Up")

References 

 
Psych